Pilsbryoconcha is a genus of bivalves belonging to the family Unionidae.

The species of this genus are found in Southeastern Asia.

Species:
Pilsbryoconcha carinifera 
Pilsbryoconcha compressa 
Pilsbryoconcha exilis 
Pilsbryoconcha expressa 
Pilsbryoconcha lemeslei 
Pilsbryoconcha linguaeformis 
Pilsbryoconcha suilla

References

Unionidae
Bivalve genera